Paracanthorhynchus is a monotypic genus of worms belonging to the family Rhadinorhynchidae. The only species is Paracanthorhynchus galaxiasus.

The species is found in Southern Australia.

References

Monotypic animal genera
Rhadinorhynchidae
Acanthocephala genera